Melanie Clare Sophie Giedroyc (born 5 June 1968) is an English actress, comedian and television presenter. With Sue Perkins, she has co-hosted series including Light Lunch for Channel 4, The Great British Bake Off for the BBC and chat show Mel and Sue for ITV.  In early 2017, Giedroyc co-presented the BBC show Let It Shine.

Early life
Giedroyc was born on 5 June 1968 in Epsom, Surrey, and grew up in Leatherhead. Her father, Michal, an aircraft designer, civil engineer and family historian, of Polish-Lithuanian descent from the aristocratic Giedroyć family, moved to Britain in 1947; he died in December 2017. Her mother, Rosemary "Rosy" Cumpston (born 1937), is of English origin. Mel Giedroyc attended the independent Oxford High School, and later attended Trinity College, Cambridge, graduating with a lower second degree in French and Italian.

Career

Television
Giedroyc is best known for comedy and presenting work with Sue Perkins. The two women met while students at the University of Cambridge and were members of the Footlights comedy club. Mel and Sue, the duo were short-listed for the Daily Express Best Newcomers Award at the Edinburgh Festival in 1993. Their first presenting roles saw them host a lunchtime show on Channel 4 called Light Lunch (and the early evening version, Late Lunch).

Giedroyc appeared with Perkins in one episode of Gimme Gimme Gimme, playing a receptionist at a hotel. She was also a presenter on Channel 4's RI:SE. She narrated Celebrity Driving School in 2003. Some other ventures include being a contestant on the 2005 series of The Games, co-starring in the 2005 BBC One sitcom Blessed and co-presenting Richard Hammond's 5 O'Clock Show on ITV. Giedroyc was in one episode of The Vicar of Dibley.

Giedroyc was the sixth student to be voted out of Comic Relief Does Fame Academy and was a celebrity judge on the 2007 edition of Making Your Mind Up along with John Barrowman. She starred as one of the presenters in the show Eurobeat: Almost Eurovision! at the Edinburgh Fringe and subsequently in the West End at the Novello Theatre. Giedroyc played the Fairy Liquid in a production of Jack and the Beanstalk at London's Barbican theatre in December 2007. She appeared in a children's sketch show for the BBC Sorry, I've Got No Head. In 2010, Giedroyc was a celebrity guest team captain on What Do Kids Know? with Rufus Hound, Joe Swash and Sara Cox on Watch and also appeared in the first episode of series two of Miranda Hart's self-titled sitcom Miranda as a life coach.

Giedroyc was a panellist on the Channel 5 programme The Wright Stuff in 2007, 2008 and in February 2010. She plays Mrs V, the owner of the Y café, in CBBC programme Sadie J and is also the voice of Mist in Mist: Sheepdog Tales, shown on Channel 5's morning show Milkshake!.

Giedroyc was reunited with Sue Perkins in 2010 to host the cookery competition The Great British Bake Off, on BBC Two from 16 August 2010. Later, in an apparently syndicated newspaper interview, Giedroyc admitted that she did the show just for the money, informing readers that she had nearly gone bankrupt. The show moved to BBC One for its fifth series and has won numerous awards.

In September 2016, Love Productions announced that a three-year deal had been agreed to broadcast The Great British Bake Off on Channel 4, instead of the BBC, from 2017. Giedroyc and Perkins announced that they would not be continuing with the show on its new network. Mary Berry later announced she was also leaving the Bake Off on the same day that fellow-judge Paul Hollywood separately announced he would be staying with the show.

In 2012 and 2013, Giedroyc hosted two special charity series for Sport Relief and Comic Relief featuring celebrities who took part for charity. In 2014, she guest hosted an episode of The Great Sport Relief Bake Off and in 2015, one episode of The Great Comic Relief Bake Off. In 2016, she presented the first episode of The Great Sport Relief Bake Off.

In March 2014, Giedroyc presented Collectaholics, a factual mini-series for BBC Two.

From May 2014, Giedroyc presented one series of the Channel 4 programme Draw It!, based upon and developed by the makers of the mobile app Draw Something.

In May 2014, Giedroyc and clinical psychologist Dr Jennifer Wild presented a one-off show for BBC One called Vertigo Road Trip about people who have a fear of heights. Reviewing the programme, in The Psychologist, Petrina Cox described it as "an engaging and valuable education for the general public about the nature of anxiety disorders such as specific phobias. It is sure to reduce stigma, inspire hope and encourage people to seek evidence-based treatments... "

On 12 November 2014, Giedroyc guest hosted an episode of The One Show with Alex Jones.

In 2015, Giedroyc narrated eight-part BBC One series Now You See It. A second series aired in 2016.

In December 2015 Giedroyc performed as Frau Schmidt in "The Sound of Music Live (2015)" which was broadcast on ITV. In January 2015, Giedroyc and Perkins were given their own daytime chat show on ITV. The show, called Mel and Sue aired for 30 episodes, every weekday at 4pm. In August 2015, it was announced that the show had not been re-commissioned.

Giedroyc and Matt Baker began co-hosting four-part BBC One series The Gift in February 2015. It will return for a second series in 2017. Giedroyc hosted the Sky1 primetime game show Relatively Clever, which began on 3 April 2015.

In May 2015, Giedroyc joined Scott Mills in commentating the semi-finals of the Eurovision Song Contest 2015 for the United Kingdom.  It was broadcast on BBC Three. Since 2016, Giedroyc has presented the Eurovision You Decide programme.

In 2017, Giedroyc co-presented the Saturday night BBC show Let It Shine – including three live shows – alongside Graham Norton. The judges were Gary Barlow, Martin Kemp and Dannii Minogue.

She narrated The Secret Chef for ITV and co-presented  Let's Sing and Dance for Comic Relief alongside Sue Perkins on BBC One.

Also in 2017, Giedroyc competed in the fourth series of Taskmaster against Lolly Adefope, Hugh Dennis, Noel Fielding and Joe Lycett. Since June 2017, Giedroyc has presented Saturday night entertainment series Pitch Battle for BBC One. She also presents the daily BBC Two game show Letterbox, having hosted 45 episodes (15 for series One, 30 for series Two) since 2017. On 23 July 2017, it was confirmed that Giedroyc and Perkins would host a new version of The Generation Game for BBC One.

In November 2017, she co-presented Children in Need for the first time. In December 2017 she hosted an episode of Have I Got News for You.

In May 2018, Giedroyc was the spokesperson for the United Kingdom as part of the Eurovision Song Contest 2018.

Mel Giedroyc: Unforgivable began airing on Dave in February 2021. It invites three celebrity guests along to Mel's confessional each week to find out who's committed sins that are so bad that they should be declared ‘unforgivable’.

Radio
Giedroyc appeared in the 1994 Radio 4 comedy series The Skivers with Nick Golson and Tim de Jongh. In July 2000, Giedroyc appeared as a contestant on The 99p Challenge, a radio show hosted by Sue Perkins.
In August 2010, Giedroyc appeared on the Dave Gorman show on Absolute Radio as one of his co-hosts, standing in for Danielle Ward, and has also appeared on series 4 to 7 of Count Arthur Strong's Radio Show! on BBC Radio 4. From 2 April 2011, with the rebranding of Radio 7 as Radio 4 extra, Giedroyc has presented The 4 O'Clock Show, a chat show including items related to children's entertainment.

From 16 April 2016, she started presenting a Saturday lunchtime show on Magic Radio from 1pm until 3pm.

On 6 September 2014, Giedroyc co-hosted with Lee Mack on his BBC Radio 2 Saturday morning show.

Other work
In November 2014 Giedroyc was a part of Gareth Malone's All Star Choir, singing the opening solo in the choir's cover version of "Wake Me Up" to raise money for the BBC's Children in Need.  On 3 and 10 November 2014, a two-part documentary about the choir was broadcast by BBC One. On 16 November, the single entered the UK Singles Chart at Number One.

Giedroyc presented the Strictly Come Dancing Live Tour from 22 January until 14 February 2016.

Giedroyc appeared in The Rocky Horror Show Live which was simulcast live to cinemas across the United Kingdom and Europe from London's Playhouse Theatre on 17 September 2015 in the role of Third Narrator.

Giedroyc appeared in the 2018 West End Revival of the Stephen Sondheim musical Company, playing the role of Sarah.

Giedroyc played Beatrice in the 2018 Rose Theatre production of Shakespeare's Much Ado About Nothing.

On 23 November 2021, it was announced that Giedroyc would dance with Neil Jones in the 2021 Strictly Come Dancing Christmas Special.

Personal life
Giedroyc is the youngest of four children. Her sister Coky Giedroyc is a film and television director; while her other sister, children's writer Kasia, is married to Philip Parham, a British diplomat.

Giedroyc is married to Ben Morris, a television director and teacher at LAMDA. They have two daughters.

Filmography

Books
2005, From Here to Maternity: One Mother of a Journey, Ebury Press,  – diary based on her first pregnancy.
2007, Going Ga-Ga: Is there life after birth?, Ebury Press,  – similar theme.
2021, The Best Things, Headline Review  - debut novel

References

External links
 

1968 births
Living people
20th-century English actresses
20th-century English comedians
21st-century English actresses
21st-century English comedians
Actresses from Surrey
Alumni of Trinity College, Cambridge
British people of Belarusian descent
British people of Polish descent
English diarists
English people of Belgian descent
English people of Belarusian descent
English people of Lithuanian descent
English people of Polish descent
English Roman Catholics
English television actresses
English television presenters
English women comedians
Mel
People educated at Oxford High School, England
People from Epsom
People from Leatherhead
WFTV Award winners
Women diarists
Handmade: Britain's Best Woodworker